Rajamangala University of Technology Srivijaya (abbreviated as RMUTSV) was established by the Rajamangala University of Technology Act on 18 January 2005.

History
Rajamangala University of Technology Srivijaya is a group university located in the south of Thailand. The main campus in Songkhla opened as the 'Southern Technic College' in 1954 with only 3 departments, while the Nakhon Si Thammarat and Trang campuses were originally the 'Nakhon Si Thammarat School of Agriculture' and the 'Trang Department of Fisheries and Science' respectively. Following the National Education Act (B.E. 2542 (1999)) which aimed to decentralize management in education institutes, Rajamangala Institute of Technology amended the law before enacting it as the “Rajamangala University of Technology Act,” which HM the King signed on 8 January 2005.

The law came into effect on 19 January 2005, combining all campuses nationwide into nine Rajamangala Universities of Technology: 
 RMUT Thanyaburi, 
 RMUT Krungthep, 
 RMUT Tawan-ok, 
 RMUT Phra Nakhon, 
 RMUT Rattanakosin, 
 RMUT Lanna, 
 Rajamangala University of Technology Srivijaya,
 RMUTSV Srivijaya, 
 RMUT Suvarnabhumi, 
 RMUT Isan.

The nine universities offer advanced vocational training at undergraduate, graduate and Ph.D. levels. All nine RMUT are under the supervision of the Office of Commission on Higher Education (OCHE), Ministry of Education.

Campus
RMUTSV is composed of three provincial areas including five campuses namely, 
 Songkhla Campus, 
 Nakhonsithammarat (Thung Yai) Campus 
 Nakhonsithammarat (Sai Yai) Campus, 
 Nakhonsithammarat (Khanom Campus, and 
 Trang Campus

RMUTSV offers education at the graduate level in ten faculties and three colleges in Agriculture, Agro-industry, Architecture, Business Administration, Engineering, Liberal Arts, Management Technology Science and Technology, Science and Fisheries and Technology, and Veterinary Medicine and College of Hospitality and Tourism, College of Industrial Technology and Management and Rattaphum College.

RMUTSV has 15,000 students. There are 4,000-5,000 enrollment students each year.

Songkhla
Educational institutions established in 2005
2005 establishments in Thailand
Technical universities and colleges in Thailand